Wotsits is a British brand of cheese flavoured corn puffs sold first by Golden Wonder and now by Walkers Crisps. The most common form is the "Really Cheesy" flavour of corn puffs. Other shapes and flavours have also been sold, including: Wotsits Giants, Wotsits Flaming Hot, Wotsits Sizzling Steak, Wotsits Prawn Cocktail and Wotsits Crunchy. The brand name in the singular ("Wotsit") refers to an individual corn puff. It is an allusion to the slang term "whatsit", a placeholder name, to which it is phonetically identical in British speech.

Varieties and flavours

Golden Wonder ownership
When Wotsits were first introduced by Golden Wonder, they were available in flavours such as Cheesy, Crispy Beef (later named Barbecue Beef and BBQ Beef), Cheese & Bacon, and Spicy Tomato. The latter two were discontinued in the 1993, and a Prawn Cocktail flavour was put onto the market after it replaced Smoky Bacon in February 1998.

In the late 1990s, Golden Wonder introduced various brand expansions of the product. The first brand extension was "Long Wotsits" in February 1995, which was longer version of the snacks, and said "How long is your Wotsit?" on the back. The second brand extension was "Weenie Wotsits" in November 1999, which was smaller version of the snacks promoted as "Little Wotsits for weenie mouths!". This was followed up with the launch of the grid-shaped "Wotsits Wafflers" in May 2000, promoted as "Big, crunchy and waffle shaped!" and the oven-based "Wotsits Mealtime Potato Shapes" in November 2000.

In February 2001, Golden Wonder teamed up with the BBC for the Robot Wars promotion. Robot Wars winning leaflets were included in special packs of Wotsits, Wotsits Wafflers, Nik Naks and Golden Wonder, excluding Weenie Wotsits and Wheat Crunchies.

In August 2001, "Whopping Wotsits" were introduced, which was longer version of the snacks promoted as a "Wot a Whopper!", and also featured as part of a promotion.  In September 2001, Golden Wonder ran a "Footie Flikka" promotion, which included twenty Footie Flikkas and a Footie Flikka album. The Mealtime Potato Shapes were later released at McDonald's restaurants in the country, and were later expanded to Wotsits Wafflers as well. Golden Wonder redesigned the "Wotsits" brands in October 2001.

In November 2001, "Wotsits Micro Snacks" were introduced, which were microwave versions of the snack and said "Deliciously hot cheesy snack", and "Wotsits Wafflers Cheesy Potato Shapes", which were oven-based versions of the snack.

In March 2002, Golden Wonder announced the launch of a football-shaped version of the product called "Wotsits Goalden Balls" to coincide with the 2002 FIFA World Cup. The product was released to complete with Walkers' "Footballs" product. In April 2002, Golden Wonder teamed up with British television duo Ant & Dec for the "Goalden Shootout" promotion. Numbered codes of the back were shown in special packs of Nik Naks, Wotsits, Wotsits Wafflers and new Wotsits Goalden Balls.

Walkers ownership
In May 2002, Golden Wonder announced they would change hands and be sold to Longulf. The Wotsits brand was, however, not included in the purchase and was announced to be sold separately to rival Walkers. The purchase was completed by November. Walkers previously released the Cheetos brand in the country (owned by their parent company PepsiCo), but with little success, where early plans were put in place in October to rebrand Wotsits under the Cheetos name. However, nothing came to be of this planned change and Walkers kept the Wotsits brand as is with a new look, replacing Cheetos.

On 3 January 2003, Walkers relaunched Wotsits with a brand new look and advertising campaign. The previous flavours alongside the Wotsits Wafflers and Weenie Wotsits varieties were retained from Golden Wonder days, alongside the addition of a "Mild Cheese" variety.

On 1 April 2004, Walkers announced the launch of a new "Flamin' Hot" flavour of the product, replacing "BBQ Beef", and was promoted as such as a "HOT NEW FLAVOUR!" On 26 July 2004, Walkers announced the launch of a new product expansion called "Wotsits Twisted", which contained twists of corn, and were available in BBQ and Really Cheesy flavours.

In February 2007, Walkers changed the packaging for all their snack products, which were Quavers, Wotsits, Squares, French Fries and Monster Munch. This packaging reflected the usage of Sunseed Oil, which was used in all products. The Multipack bags were in a different layout, being in Landscape style. In May 2008 Wotsits were changed from being fried to baked instead.

In December 2009, Quavers, Wotsits, Squares, and French Fries all changed their packaging again to coincide with a "99 Calories or Less" range with a consumers’ focus on “New Year New Me”.  Wotsits had 95 calories in multipack bags and 99 calories in standard bags at the time. In January 2012 the Walkers logo was re-added again and after a while, the brand has simply been sold in Really Cheesy flavour.

In August 2012, Wotsits Wafflers were reintroduced, being available in Bacon flavour. In May 2013, it was reintroduced as simply "Wafflers" under the Smiths brand, alongside the relaunch of Wotsits Twisted, branded solely as "Twisted".

A limited edition version Zombie Fingers was put on sale for Halloween in September 2013 and has returned at following Halloweens. These come in Flamin' Hot flavour and are longer and curlier than normal Wotsits.

On 9 January 2020, Walkers announced that the Flamin' Hot and BBQ Beef (renamed to "Sizzlin' Steak") would return to store shelves due to popular demand. A new variety called "Wotsits Giants" was also introduced around the same time, containing larger pieces of corn double the size of standard Wotsits, and are sold in Really Cheesy and Flamin' Hot.

On 18 February 2022, it was announced that the Prawn Cocktail flavour would return to store shelves as a Wotsits Giants flavour in March, once again due to popular demand. At the same time,it was announced that Crunchy Wotsits would be introduced, in Really Cheesy and Flamin' Hot flavours.

Advertising

The brand was the first to introduce inserts into its packs in March 1996, with the insertion of "Pogs". In November 1997, ialso inserted Merlin football stickers and other inserts aimed at 11-year-old boys. The brand was advertised with the strapline "you only get a whoosh with a Wotsit" between 1994 and 2002 following a campaign designed by JWT of a play on words. Wotsits packaging used to come with a joke or trivia section on the back.

Wotsits were one of the sponsors of SMTV Live (alongside other Walkers snacks such as Monster Munch and Squares) from 4 January 2003 until the show's discontinuation on 27 December 2003.

In 2003, the advertising agency Abbott Mead Vickers made a public apology when the Parliamentary Select Committee on Health brought to light a private brief that it had made to Frito-Lay (Walkers' owners) where it proposed encouraging children (4 to 9 years old) to believe that "Wotsits are for me—I'm going to buy them when I get the chance and pester Mum for them when she next goes shopping".

References

Brand name snack foods
Walkers (snack foods) brands